Seyed Ebrahim Tahami (born 21 September 1966 in Abadan) is a retired Iranian midfielder. He was formerly playing for Sanat Naft Abadan, Esteghlal Ahvaz, Esteghlal Tehran and Iran national football team. He is known as the top dribbler in the football history dribbling 14 times in a row in a single match.

References
 https://fa.wikipedia.org/wiki/ابراهیم_تهامی

https://www.khabaronline.ir/news/388034/ابراهیم-تهامی-می-دانم-باور-نمی-کنید-ولی-تا-آخر-عمرم-می-گویم

External links
 
 Ebrahim Tahami at TeamMelli.com

Iran international footballers
Iranian footballers
Esteghlal F.C. players
Esteghlal Ahvaz players
Sanat Naft Abadan F.C. players
Living people
1966 births
Association football midfielders